City bus line number 20 Nove Stožice P+R – Fužine P+R is the third most heavily loaded of the 32 bus lines in Ljubljana. Annually approximately 9,000,000 passengers are transported. Takes place in the North - East corridors on some busiest roads connecting Nove Stožice, Bežigrad, Krakovo, Vodmat, Moste, Nove Fužine with the city center (Bavarski dvor).

History

Line variants 
 20 Nove Stožice P+R – Fužine P+R (Weekdays - 4.53-22.25, Saturdays - 5.00-22.25)
 20Z Nove Stožice P+R – Fužine P+R – Zalog (Sundays and Public holidays - 6.00-22.25)

Sources

See also 
 Ljubljana Passenger Transport
 City bus service no. 1 (Ljubljana)
 City bus service no. 6 (Ljubljana)

Ljubljana Passenger Transport
Bus routes in Ljubljana